XHUHV-FM is a radio station serving Chicontepec de Tejeda, Veracruz owned by the Universidad Huasteca Veracruzana. It is branded as Radio CEU (for Comunidades Educativas Unidas) and broadcasts on 97.9 FM.

It received its social use concession in May 2015 and was among the first stations to ever receive such a concession. The station had been operating prior to then without a concession.

References

Radio stations in Veracruz
University radio stations in Mexico